Lanard Copeland (born July 26, 1965) is an American-Australian professional basketball coach and former player. Born in Atlanta, Georgia, he played in the National Basketball League (NBL) from 1992 to 2008.

Playing career

Early years
Copeland played four years of college basketball for Georgia State before going undrafted in the 1989 NBA draft. He later signed as a free agent with the Philadelphia 76ers out of the Southern California Summer Pro League. He played in 23 games for the 76ers as a rookie in 1989–90, averaging 3.2 points per game.

For the 1990–91 season, Copeland joined the Tulsa Fast Breakers of the Continental Basketball Association (CBA). However, on December 3, 1990, he was traded to the Rapid City Thrillers. Following the conclusion of the 1990–91 CBA season, he joined the Atlanta Trojans of the United States Basketball League.

On August 30, 1991, Copeland signed with the Los Angeles Clippers. His stint with the Clippers lasted just three months as he was waived by the team on December 3, 1991. Copeland returned to the CBA in December 1992, signing with the Capital Region Pontiacs.

NBL
In 1992, Copeland moved to Australia where he joined the Melbourne Tigers, a team he remained with until 2005. During his time with the Tigers, Copeland played 449 games over 14 seasons, recording 9,862 points, 1,763 rebounds, 1,438 assists and 233 blocked shots. He won league championships in 1993 and 1997, and was named the NBL Grand Final MVP in 1997. He was also a member of the All-NBL First Team in 1999 and 2002.

Copeland departed the Tigers following the 2004–05 NBL season and joined the Brisbane Bullets for the 2005–06 season. He played just one season for Brisbane before joining the Adelaide 36ers for the 2006–07 season. He played two seasons for Adelaide, retiring from the NBL following the 2007–08 NBL season. In 532 career NBL games over 17 seasons, Copeland averaged 20.2 points, 3.7 rebounds and 3.0 assists per game. His 10,735 points are ranked fourth all-time in NBL history.

Coaching career
After retiring as a player, Copeland went on to serve as Phil Smyth's assistant at the ACB Academy, head coach of the Altona Gators’ men's Big V team, and head coach of the Haileybury College men's team which won the Victorian High School championship in 2014.

On 6 April 2016, Copeland was named an assistant coach of the Sydney Kings, appointed alongside Dean Vickerman to serve under newly-appointed head coach Andrew Gaze, Copeland's long-time teammate at the Melbourne Tigers. Copeland left the Kings when Gaze stepped down as coach after the 2018–19 NBL season.

References

External links

Lanard Copeland at nbl.com.au
Lanard Copeland at foxsportspulse.com

1965 births
Living people
Adelaide 36ers players
African-American basketball players
American emigrants to Australia
American expatriate basketball people in Australia
American men's basketball players
Australian men's basketball players
Basketball players from Atlanta
Brisbane Bullets players
Capital Region Pontiacs players
Georgia State Panthers men's basketball players
Los Angeles Clippers players
Melbourne Tigers players
Philadelphia 76ers players
Rapid City Thrillers players
Shooting guards
Basketball players from Melbourne
Tulsa Fast Breakers players
Undrafted National Basketball Association players
American expatriate basketball people in the Philippines
Philippine Basketball Association imports
TNT Tropang Giga players
21st-century African-American people
20th-century African-American sportspeople